Allison Parrish is an American poet, software engineer, creative coder, and game designer, notable as one of the most prominent early makers of creative, literary Twitter bots. She was named "Best Maker of Poetry Bots" by The Village Voice in 2016. Parrish has produced a textbook introduction to creative coding in Python, more specifically Processing.py. Parrish holds a BA in Linguistics from UC Berkeley, and a Master of Professional Studies from the Interactive Telecommunications Program (ITP), NYU. She has been a Writer-in-Residence in the English Department of Fordham University, 2014–16, and an Assistant Arts Professor at the ITP since 2016.

Selected works 
  A conceptual poetic Twitter bot launched 2007 and later published as a book: 
  With collaborators Adam Simon and Tim Szetela.

References

External links 
 Allison Parrish's website 

Year of birth missing (living people)
21st-century American poets
American software engineers
People from Bountiful, Utah
University of California, Berkeley alumni
New York University alumni
Living people
American video game designers
Electronic literature writers